Timothy O'Sullivan (1939 – 2 July 1984) was an Irish Gaelic footballer. He played at club level with Castleislands Desmonds and Kingdom and at inter-county level with the Kerry senior football team.

Career

O'Sullivan first came to Gaelic football prominence as captain of the Castleisland District team that won the 1957 County Minor Championship. He first appeared on the inter-county scene with the Kerry junior team that won the Munster Junior Championship title in 1960. O'Sullivan quickly progressed to the senior team and made his debut in the 1960-61 league. He was at centre-forward when Kerry won the 1962 All-Ireland Championship title after a defeat of Roscommon in the final. O'Sullivan also won four consecutive Munster Championship titles and was involved in two National League title-winning teams.

Honours

Castleisland District
Kerry Minor Football Championship: 1957 (c)

Kerry
All-Ireland Senior Football Championship: 1962
Munster Senior Football Championship: 1961, 1962, 1963, 1964
National Football League: 1960-61, 1962-63

References

1939 births
1994 deaths
Castleisland Gaelic footballers
Kerry inter-county Gaelic footballers